The 1974 Soviet football championship was the 42nd seasons of competitive football in the Soviet Union and the 36th among teams of sports societies and factories. Dinamo Kiev won the championship becoming the Soviet domestic champions for the sixth time.

Honours

Notes = Number in parentheses is the times that club has won that honour. * indicates new record for competition

Soviet Union football championship

Top League

First League

Second League (finals)

 [Nov 20-30, Sochi]

Top goalscorers

Top League
Oleg Blokhin (Dinamo Kiev) – 20 goals

First League
Nikolay Klimov (Tavriya Simferopol), Aleksandr Markin (Zvezda Perm)  – 25 goals

References

External links
 1974 Soviet football championship. RSSSF